Helvetic Airways, previously named Odette Airways, is a Swiss regional airline headquartered in Kloten with its fleet stationed at Zurich Airport. It operates flights to destinations in Europe and Northern Africa, mainly leisure markets, on its own behalf, as well as scheduled flights on behalf of Swiss International Air Lines and Lufthansa, using their fleet of Embraer 190s and Embraer 190-E2s.

History

Helvetic Airways was established in the autumn of 2003, as a rebranding and extension of the existing airline Odette Airways, to serve destinations in South-Eastern Europe. Switzerland's first budget carrier began operating in November, with a Fokker 100 flying to three destinations. By 2004, the fleet had grown to seven aircraft.

In December 2006, the carrier unveiled a new look for its aircraft. Since then, all the Fokker 100s have livery in red-white-silver grey colours, with the Swiss cross on the tailfin.

In October 2010, the Swiss news media announced a new base in Bern Airport.

On 18 February 2013, in the 2013 Belgian diamond heist, eight men armed with automatic weapons and dressed in police uniforms seized 120 small parcels, containing an estimated $50 million (£32,000,000) worth of diamonds from a Helvetic Airways Fokker 100 passenger plane, loaded with passengers preparing for departure to Zurich. The men drove two vehicles through a hole they had cut in the airports perimeter fence to Flight LX789, which had just been loaded with diamonds from a Brink's armoured van. The men were able to execute the operation within five minutes with no injuries and without firing a shot.

In December 2014, Helvetic Airways began to take over seven Embraer 190s, which were freed by Niki changing their fleet.

Since March 2016, there is a wet-lease contract with Lufthansa for the route Zurich-Munich.

In 2018, Swiss International Air Lines (SWISS) expanded its partnership with Helvetic Airways, announcing that it will deploy up to eight Helvetic Airways Embraer E190-E2 aircraft or similar equipment on its route network, from 2019 onwards. On 14 June 2019, the last Helvetic Airways Fokker 100 left the fleet. Shortly after, on 29 October 2019, the carrier took delivery of its first Embraer E190-E2 aircraft.

Destinations
Scheduled destinations as of September 2019 (not included are the routes served for Swiss International Air Lines on a long-term wet-lease contract):

Fleet

Current fleet
As of February 2022, the Helvetic Airways fleet includes the following aircraft:

Historic fleet 
Helvetic also formerly operated the following types of aircraft:
 Airbus A319-100
 Fokker 100
 McDonnell Douglas MD-83

References

External links

 

Airlines of Switzerland
Airlines established in 2003
Low-cost carriers
2003 establishments in Switzerland
Transport in the canton of Zürich
Companies based in the canton of Zürich